David Kennedy Henderson  FRSE FRCPE (24 April 1884 – 20 April 1965) was a Scottish physician and  psychiatrist and served as president of the Royal College of Physicians of Edinburgh 1949 to 1951.

Biography
He was born on 24 April 1884 in Dumfries, Scotland. In 1913 he was awarded a PhD by the University of Edinburgh for his thesis "Cerebral syphilis a clinical analysis of twenty-six cases, seven with autopsy".

He co-published with R.D. Gillespie A Textbook of Psychiatry (first edition 1927), which became internationally influential for several decades. A series of lectures he gave in New York, America, were published as Psychopathic states in 1939, and ended up contributing to a narrowing of the public understanding of psychopathy as violently antisocial, though Henderson had described various different types many of which were not violent or criminal. The Henderson Hospital, a specialist national unit in London set up to manage and treat the now contested diagnosis of 'psychopathic' personality disorder, was named after him.

He was physician-superintendent in charge at the Gartnavel Royal Hospital in Glasgow from 1921 to 1932. In 1932 he replaced the late Dr George Matthew Robertson as Physician Superintendent of the Edinburgh Royal Hospital, being replaced in turn in 1955 by Dr Thomas Arthur Munro.

His textbook on psychiatry has been described as the key to the Glasgow approach to mental illness, and Henderson in turn credited the approach of the influential Adolf Meyer whom he had worked with in America. Henderson also studied for some months in Germany with a key founder of modern psychiatry, Emil Kraepelin, whom he admired but found lacking in sensitivity to patients.

In 1946, he was elected to the Aesculapian Club of Edinburgh. He was knighted in 1947 and elected president of the Royal College of Physicians of Edinburgh in 1949. The portrait of Henderson by David Alison is held by the Royal College of Physicians of Edinburgh.

He died on 20 April 1965 in Edinburgh, Scotland.

Legacy
Henderson's student Donald Ewan Cameron, who also worked at the Gartnavel Hospital, would write an obituary for Henderson in the American Journal of Psychiatry. Cameron would rise to international prominence as president of the Canadian Psychiatric Association, American Psychiatric Association and World Psychiatric Association, but ultimately be known for conducting harmful experiments on mental patients as part of the MKUltra project. Henderson's approach as expressed in his textbook is also thought to have influenced the infamous 'antipsychiatrist' R.D. Laing who later worked at the Gartnavel Hospital. The Henderson Hospital to which he gave his name evolved into a Democratic Therapeutic Community (DTC) that became an international centre of excellence for the treatment of survivors of severe trauma, before changes in healthcare funding in the United Kingdom forced its closure in 2008. The Henderson Heritage Group, in which people who have the experience of having lived at or worked in the Henderson Hospital DTC work together to preserve the legacy of the hospital, continues to promote the work of the Henderson and to curate its archives.

References

1884 births
Presidents of the Royal College of Physicians of Edinburgh
Scottish psychiatrists
1965 deaths
People from Dumfries